Bad Ronald was a rap-rock band from New York City who released their self-titled debut album in 2001.  Their first single, "Let's Begin", was briefly on MTV's rotation and featured in the film Not Another Teen Movie.  Their second single, "1st Time", was featured in the 2002 movie Orange County.  The band achieved little success in spite of their promotion with MTV.  The group formed in 1999 after working shows in New York City. The group was named after former Crazy Town member Brandon Calabro's dog Kal El Bad Ronald Santeria. The group wanted "to form a band that combined rap, pop, rock, and sophomoric humor."

Discography

Studio albums

Singles

Music videos

Band members
 Doug Ray MC
 White Owl MC
 Kaz Gamble MC
 DJ Deetalx turntables

Single projects
After the breakup of Bad Ronald, MC Doug Ray (also known as Toothpick) released an album in 2004 titled "Time Travelin' Couch". He also formed a rap duo with LFO frontman Rich Cronin in 2006 lasting until 2008 releasing an album in 2006 titled Life Goes On. Kaz Gamble went on to form the band Cooler Kids.

References

Rap rock groups
Musical groups from New York City